Sumiyoshi (written: 住吉) is a Japanese surname. Notable people with the surname include:

Surname:
 Jelani Reshaun Sumiyoshi, Japanese-Americans footballer
, Japanese television personality
, Japanese speed skater
, Japanese general
, Japanese manga artist

Sumiyoshi (written: 純義) is also a masculine Japanese given name. Notable people with the name include:
, Imperial Japanese Navy admiral

Japanese-language surnames
Japanese masculine given names